Ahmad Haseeb is a film director and producer. Haseeb won the Best Documentary award at Kara Film Festival in 2007 for A Music Fairy, a short subject about pop icon Nazia Hassan. Haseeb also directed rock group Junoon's music video "Rooh ki pyas" (non-commercial) as a college project. In 2006 Haseeb received a master's degree in Multimedia Arts from National College of Arts Lahore. Haseeb has worked as a producer for Waqt TV but joined city42 later. Ahmad Haseeb also composed and produced a cricket World Cup song "Aya Hai World cup" with Cllr Sitarah Anjum and Rehan Naseer released on 24 February 2011.

See also 
Nazia Hassan
A Music Fairy

References

External links
The life and times of Nazia Hassan
New Documentary on Pakistan's Disco Deewane Girl
Biddu's Company
Indopia-India online

Documentary film producers
Pakistani documentary film directors
Living people
National College of Arts alumni
Pakistani documentary filmmakers
Film directors from Lahore
Punjabi people
1983 births